Abhanpur is one of the 90 Legislative Assembly constituencies of Chhattisgarh state in India. It is in Raipur district. The seat has formed after the demolition of Raipur Town Vidhansabha Constituency in 2008.

Members of Legislative Assembly

Election results

2018

See also
List of constituencies of the Chhattisgarh Legislative Assembly
Raipur district

References

Raipur district
Assembly constituencies of Chhattisgarh